Nihon Koku may refer to:
Japan - Nihon Koku, in Japanese
Japan Airlines - Nihon Kōkū, in Japanese